Sodhi Bala is a village of Khushab District in the Punjab Province of Pakistan. It is situated on the link road (Khatwaii to Surakki Jhalar road),  from Khatwaii, a prominent stop on Khushab Naushehra road.

Geography
There are four natural spring in the surroundings of the village named, Uchh, Gaddari, Lachhi Vaalah, and Gabhan.

Mountains include Balochan Wala, Taawaan, Kot Wala Faqir, Ghaban Wali Dandi, Nikky Wala Pahar, and Domali .

Surrounding villages include Jahlar and Paprrali (west), Surraki (north), Pothay and Khurra (east), Chapparr Sharif, and Kawad (south).

There are 15 major wells in the lands of Sodhi.

Different parts of the agricultural lands are named Chaharr, Gaambi, Chaambi, Sone aali, Kaane aali, Kahar, Pachosar, Chahrri, Mohra, Kalehar, Chauntri, Gadaari, Bhandar Chatta, Dabbak, Chhoee, Bheelan Aala, Ugaal, Nikky, Waatrrin, Kahar'rra, Bagri Chaari, and Lamhri.

Economy
Major crops are wheat, tide, millet, corn, cauliflower, Potatoes, tomato, Pepper, Capsicum and others.

Archaeological monuments

File:Sodhi Bala.jpg Sodhi Bala
Buddhist Dheri near Uchh.
Ruins of old village called Kot, situated one and a half km south of the village.
Ruins of an old village at nearby peak called Killot.
There are also many Buddhist sacred places called "Marris".

Old Sufis, Saints of the village

Mian Siraj udDin urf Mian Turki, Mian Ghulam Nabi (saint, poet), Molvi Feroz Muhammad (saint, hakeem), Mian Ghulam Rasool (saint, hakeem)
The most remembered and respected personality Ustad Maulana Muzafar ud Din Awan of Warrcha. He was ustad (teacher) of almost all the Huffaz of the village; named Hafiz Fazal Elahi, Hafiz Sher Muhammad, Hafiz Mian Elahi Bakhsh, Hafiz Sher Muhammad (Kotli Wala), Hafiz Allah Jawaeya, Hafiz Mian Muhammad, Hafiz Ahmad Raza, Hafiz Khuda Bakhsh, Hafiz Ameer Afzal, Hafiz Habib Nawaz, Hafiz Abdul Majeed, Hafiz Muhammad Nawaz (Qari), Hafiz Sikanadar Hayat, Hafiz Haq Nawaz, Hafiz Akbar Din, Hafiz Muhammad Aslam, Hafiz Rab Nawaz (Sodhi Zereen) including his four sons named; Hafiz Fazal e Haq, Qari Muhammad Ibrahim, Hafiz Qadir Hayat Awan, Hafiz Muhammad Zafar, Qari Abdul Qayyum, Hafiz Farrukh Hayat.

References

Local Government Elections - Government of Pakistan

Union councils of Khushab District
Populated places in Khushab District